Hipponix conicus, common name the cone-shaped hoof shell, is a species of small limpet-like sea snail, a marine gastropod mollusk in the family Hipponicidae, the hoof snails.

Description
The reddish-brown or white fin-shaped shell has coarse ribs. The shell grows to a length of 2 cm.

Distribution
This species can be found on shallow sublittoral on hard surfaces (such as sea urchin spines or other shells). It occurs in European waters, the Red Sea and in the Indo-Pacific off Aldabra, Chagos, the east coast of South Africa, the Mascarene Basin  and off New Zealand.

References

 Kilburn, R.N. & Rippey, E. (1982) Sea Shells of Southern Africa. Macmillan South Africa, Johannesburg, xi + 249 pp. page(s): 56 
 Drivas, J. & M. Jay (1988). Coquillages de La Réunion et de l'île Maurice
 Gofas, S.; Le Renard, J.; Bouchet, P. (2001). Mollusca, in: Costello, M.J. et al. (Ed.) (2001). European register of marine species: a check-list of the marine species in Europe and a bibliography of guides to their identification. Collection Patrimoines Naturels, 50: pp. 180–213
 Spencer, H.; Marshall. B. (2009). All Mollusca except Opisthobranchia. In: Gordon, D. (Ed.) (2009). New Zealand Inventory of Biodiversity. Volume One: Kingdom Animalia. 584 pp

External links
 Branch, G.M. et al. (2002). Two Oceans. 5th impression. David Philip, Cate Town & Johannesburg

Hipponicidae
Gastropods described in 1817